60th Regiment or 60th Infantry Regiment may refer to:

 60th Regiment of Foot (disambiguation), three British Army units carried this name 
 60th Infantry Regiment (United States), a unit of the United States Army
 60th Air Defense Artillery Regiment, a unit of the United States Army

American Civil War
Union (Northern) Army
 60th Illinois Volunteer Infantry Regiment 
 60th Indiana Infantry Regiment
 60th Ohio Infantry
 60th United States Colored Infantry Regiment
 60th New York Volunteer Infantry
 60th Regiment Massachusetts Volunteer Infantry

Confederate (Southern) Army
 60th Virginia Infantry
 60th Tennessee Infantry Regiment